Harry J. "Little" Long (December 28, 1897 – December 8, 1945) was an American college football coach and professor of biology and brother of Fred T. Long.  He was born in Decatur, Illinois and graduated from Decatur High School in 1915.  He enrolled at the James Millikin University in the fall of 1915 and graduated with a Bachelor of Arts degree in 1919, having majored in biology and minored in mathematics.  He completed his Master of Arts degree in biology at Columbia University in New York in 1928 and was working on completing his Doctorate at the University of Michigan before his untimely death in 1945.

Harry began his coaching career at Prairie View A&M University in 1919 and then coached at Langston University in Oklahoma in 1922 before taking over at Paul Quinn College in 1923 when his brother Fred left Paul Quinn for Wiley College. Harry became head football coach at Paul Quinn for the next four seasons (1923–1927). In 1924 Paul Quinn tied Tuskegee, 0–0, and earned a share of the black college football national championship. He was the fifth head football coach at Tennessee State University in Nashville, Tennessee and he held that position for the 1928 season. His career coaching record at Tennessee State was 0–4–1.   He left Tennessee State in 1929 to join his brother Fred's staff at Wiley College and head up that college's biology department.

On December 8, 1945, as the Wiley Wildcats were playing Florida A&M in the Orange Blossom Classic in Tampa, Florida for the black college football national championship Long, who was still an assistant coach on his brother's staff, suffered a fatal heart attack on the sidelines during the first quarter of the game and died.  The Wildcats still went on to defeat Florida A&M by a score of 32–6 and won the national title for 1945.

References

1897 births
1945 deaths
Langston Lions football coaches
Paul Quinn Tigers football coaches
Prairie View A&M Panthers football coaches
Tennessee State Tigers football coaches
Wiley Wildcats football coaches
Wiley College faculty
Columbia Graduate School of Arts and Sciences alumni
Millikin University alumni
University of Michigan alumni
Sportspeople from Decatur, Illinois
African-American coaches of American football
20th-century African-American people